The 2001 WNBA season was the 5th season for the Cleveland Rockers. The Rockers topped the Eastern Conference with the best record in franchise history, but their season ended shortly in the playoffs, losing in the first round to eventual conference champion Charlotte Sting.

Offseason

WNBA Draft

Regular season

Season standings

Season schedule

Playoffs

Player stats

References

Cleveland Rockers seasons
Cleveland
Cleveland Rockers